Elections in Gilgit-Baltistan, a Semi-Province of Pakistan are held according to Gilgit-Baltistan (Empowerment and Self Governance Order) 2009 Election Commission of Gilgit-Baltistan is responsible of conducting elections in Gilgit-Baltistan.Since this order came into power, three Provincial Elections have been conducted.

Gilgit Baltistan Assembly is the unicameral legislature of Gilgit-Baltistan. Gilgit Baltistan Assembly consists of 33 Members which include 24 General Seats, 6 Women Seats, and 3 Technocrat Seats.

Gilgit Baltistan has no Representation in Parliament of Pakistan because of disputed status of Jammu and Kashmir. Currently there is a bill submitted in Senate of Pakistan to give Gilgit Baltistan a status of Interim Province and give Representation in Both chambers of Parliament of Pakistan.

Assembly Elections 
Assembly Elections are conducted 5 years. Since 2009 three elections have been conducted. Results of each elections with maps are shown below:

References